Bibimys torresi), also known as Torres's crimson-nosed rat is a species of rodent in the family Cricetidae.
It is found in Argentina.

References

Bibimys
Mammals described in 1979